The 1934 International Lawn Tennis Challenge was the 29th edition of what is now known as the Davis Cup. 10 teams would enter the Europe Zone (with 17 teams taking part in the qualifying rounds), while only 5 would enter the Americas Zone, 3 in North America and 2 in South America.  Due to the large number of entries in Europe, a "Qualifying Round" system was introduced in order to better manage the number of teams competing. European teams which lost before the 1933 Europe Zone semifinals would play-off against each other for four spots in the 1934 Europe Zone main draw.

In the America Inter-Zonal Final the United States received a walkover due to Brazil's absence, while in the Europe Zone final Australia defeated Czechoslovakia. The United States defeated Australia in the Inter-Zonal play-off, but would fall to Great Britain in the Challenge Round. The final was played at the All England Club Centre Court in Wimbledon, London, England on 28–31 July.

America Zone

North & Central America Zone

South America Zone

Americas Inter-Zonal Final
United States vs. Brazil

United States defeated Brazil by walkover.

Europe Zone

Qualifying round

Main Draw

Final
Czechoslovakia vs. Australia

Inter-Zonal Final
United States vs. Australia

Challenge Round
Great Britain vs. United States

See also
 1934 Wightman Cup

References

External links
Davis Cup official website

Davis Cups by year
 
International Lawn Tennis Challenge
International Lawn Tennis Challenge
International Lawn Tennis Challenge
International Lawn Tennis Challenge